The Solothurn-Arsenal was an Estonian reverse-engineered copy of the Swiss S-18/100 anti-tank rifle.  It was manufactured without license in Estonia between 1938 and 1940.  Apart from the prototypes, only 20 were produced and deployed with 1st and 7th Infantry Regiments by the time of Soviet invasion in 1940.

See also 
 Solothurn S-18/100

References 
 

Military equipment of Estonia
Anti-tank weapons
20 mm artillery
Anti-tank rifles
Military equipment introduced in the 1930s